Gary Sanchez may refer to:

Gary Sánchez (born 1992), baseball player
Gary Sanchez Productions, a production company operated by Will Ferrell and Adam McKay